Emamzadeh Hashem or Imamzade Hashem is a Shrine in Bala Larijan District, Amol county, Mazandaran province, Iran. The shrine is located in the northwest of Haraz Road, on the way from Amol to Tehran.

According to history, Imamzadeh Hashem is a descendant of Imam Hassan Mojtaba. According to the evidence, there used to be a caravanserai next to this tomb, which has been destroyed in recent years. Maxime Siroux told about that caravanserai in his book named  "Caravanserails d'Iran".

References 

Shrines in Iran